New York's 56th State Senate district is one of 63 districts in the New York State Senate. It has been represented by Democrat Jeremy Cooney since 2021, succeeding Republican Joseph Robach.

Geography
District 56 is located entirely within Monroe County in Western New York, including much of western Rochester and its surrounding suburbs of Brighton, Gates, Greece, Parma, Clarkson, and Hamlin.

The district overlaps with New York's 25th congressional district and with the 134th, 136th, 137th, 138th, and 139th districts of the New York State Assembly.

Recent election results

2020

2018

2016

2014

2012

Federal results in District 56

References

56